Patrice Dimitriou (born 11 March 1983) is a French professional footballer who plays for Montceau Bourgogne as a midfielder.

Career
A product of the youth set-up at Gueugnon during the club's time in Ligue 2, Dimitriou began his senior career with Bourg-Péronnas in 2004. He went on to join Moulins in 2006 and spent five seasons with the club, including one campaign in the Championnat National in 2009–10. In the summer of 2011, he returned to Bourg-Péronnas and in 2015 was part of the side that won promotion to Ligue 2 for the first time in the team's history.

External links
 Patrice Dimitriou at foot-national.com
 
 
 

1983 births
Living people
People from Rillieux-la-Pape
French footballers
Association football midfielders
Football Bourg-en-Bresse Péronnas 01 players
AS Moulins players
FC Montceau Bourgogne players
Championnat National players
Ligue 2 players
Sportspeople from Lyon Metropolis
Footballers from Auvergne-Rhône-Alpes